Big 4x (stylized in all caps) is the debut studio album by American rapper Stunna 4 Vegas. It was released on May 10, 2019, by Billion Dollar Baby Entertainment and Interscope Records. The album features guest appearances from DaBaby (Stunna 4 Vegas's mentor and owner of his label), Lil Durk, NLE Choppa, Offset and Young Nudy. The album peaked at number 50 on the Billboard 200.

Promotion

Singles 
"Ashley" featuring DaBaby, was released as the album's lead single on July 18, 2019, along with a music video.

Music videos 
 A music video for "Intro" was released on May 10, 2019.
 A music video for "Punch Me In Pt. 4" was released on May 24, 2019.
 A music video for "Big 4x Freestyle" was released on May 28, 2019.
 A music video for "Double D's" was released on September 5, 2019.
 A music video for "100 or Better" featuring NLE Choppa was released on November 19, 2019.

Critical reception 
Big 4x received generally positive reviews. Erika Marie of HotNewHipHop called the album "impressive" and "solid". John Yu of KZSC Santa Cruz said the album was "full of potential and high-energy songs".

Commercial performance 
Big 4x debuted at number 50 on the Billboard 200 on the week ending May 24, 2019, making it his first entry on any Billboard chart.

Track listing

Personnel
Credits adapted from Tidal

 Khalick Antonio Caldwell – vocals
 Jonathan Lyndale Kirk – vocals (tracks: 2, 10)
 Kiari Kendrell Cephus – vocals (track 4)
 Bryson Lashun Potts – vocals (track 6)
 Quantavious Tavario Thomas – vocals (track 8)
 Durk Derrick Banks – vocals (track 12)
 Antwain Lamont Fox – producer (tracks: 1, 6, 7, 11), recording (tracks: 1, 3, 5–7, 11, 12)
 Daniel Sekyi – producer (tracks: 1, 12)
 Tahj Morgan – producer and recording (tracks: 2, 8)
 Ronald Luis Johnson – producer (tracks: 3, 5)
 Milan Torne – producer (track 4)
 Khaleel Griffin – producer (track 8)
 Corey Anderson – producer (track 9)
 Anthony Lesean Mosley – producer (track 10)
 De Juane Malachi Dunwood – producer (track 12), recording (track 10)
 Weston McKnight – recording (track 4)
 BJ Mekk – recording (track 9)
 Kevin Mccloskey – mixing

Charts

References

2019 debut albums
Stunna 4 Vegas albums
Interscope Records albums